Elampillai is a panchayat town in Salem district in the Indian state of Tamil Nadu.  It is known for textiles like silk sarees and other allied works like Jacquard punching and saree designing.

Geography
Elampillai has an average elevation of 257 metres (843 feet). Kanjamalai hill is about 3 km from the Eastern side of the town. Having water source from cauvery (mettur) and lake in that town.

Demographics
, Elampillai had a population of 11,797. Males constitute 51% of the population and females 49%. Elampillai has an average literacy rate of 83.96%, higher than the state average of 80.09%: male literacy is 89.89%, and female literacy is 77.79%. In Elampillai, 9.54% of the population is under 6 years of age.

Economy
Elampillai's economy depends mainly on the textile industry. It serves as a hub for marketing textiles produced in the surrounding villages.
Elampillai is famous for iron ore containing Banded Magnetite Quartzite rocks.
Elampillai is famous for traditional and fancy sarees.
Elampillai has nearly 10 banks with in 1 km surrounding, it is one of the industry cum marketing city to pay more tax to government.

References

Cities and towns in Salem district